Maratus combustus is a species of peacock spider native to Australia. The species was discovered together with Maratus felinus and Maratus aquilus by a research group from Monash University, near Lake Jasper in the South West region of Western Australia. However, the ranges of each species do not overlap.

Description 
The spider has a medium-dark burnt orange color on its abdomen. Like other Maratus species, it is very small. Male spiders are brighter colored than female spiders.

References 

Spiders described in 2019
Spiders of Australia
Salticidae